The Diocese of Asolo (Latin: Dioecesis Civitatis Novae Italian: Diocesi di Asolo) was a Roman Catholic diocese located in the town of Asolo in the Veneto Region of Northern Italy. In 969, it was suppressed and united with the Diocese of Treviso.

Ordinaries

Diocese of Asolo
Erected: 6th century
Latin Name: Cardicensis
Metropolitan: Patriarchate of Grado

Domenico Gaffaro (5 Nov 1348 Appointed – 1371 Died)
Antonio Correr, O.P. (24 May 1406 – 15 Jul 1409 Appointed, Bishop of Ceneda)

Suppressed: 969

See also
Catholic Church in Italy

References

Former Roman Catholic dioceses in Italy